Le Pont-de-Beauvoisin is a  commune in the Savoie department in the Auvergne-Rhône-Alpes region in south-eastern France. It lies on the right bank of the Guiers, opposite Le Pont-de-Beauvoisin in Isère. Merchant, financier and politician Emmanuel Crétet was born here in 1747.

See also
Communes of the Savoie department

References

Communes of Savoie